Jennifer Spence (born January 22, 1977) is a Canadian actress. Her acting credits include playing Dr. Lisa Park on the Stargate Universe television series and Betty Robertson on the series Continuum.

Career
Spence has had principal roles on a number of television series, including Exes and Ohs, The 4400, Reunion and Write & Wrong. She appeared in recurring roles on Killer Instinct, DaVinci's Inquest, You Me Her, and Travelers.

Immediately following the cancellation of Stargate Universe, Spence joined some other of the show's cast (including Michael Dopud) in a pilot of the new show Echoes, produced by Stargate's Mark Savela and Ken Kabatoff. In 2012, Spence had roles in episodes of three network television shows, The Killing, Alcatraz and Supernatural. Spence had a recurring role in the science fiction television series Continuum, as Detective Betty Robertson, which aired from May 2012 to October 2015. In 2013, she had a featured role in the award-winning film Down River, which was written and directed by her husband Ben Ratner.

Personal life
Spence was born and raised in Toronto, Ontario, by a British father and third-generation Japanese Canadian mother. She married actor Benjamin Ratner in 2011, and starred in his 2013 feature film Down River.  They reside in Vancouver, British Columbia.

Filmography

Film

Television

References

External links

1977 births
Actresses from Toronto
Canadian people of British descent
Canadian actresses of Japanese descent
Canadian television actresses
Living people